Kappa Alpha Lambda  is a Greek-Lettered Organization (GLO)/Sorority established for professional lesbians. Founded October 19, 2003, in Atlanta, Georgia, on the campus of Clark Atlanta University. The Sorority's mission is to "develop and maintain positive visibility of lesbian women in our communities."

The Sorority has formulated a 5-Facet Philanthropic Programming Platform, including Diversity Education and Civil Equality. It is the only LGBT Greek-letter organization to sign the Human Rights Campaign's Million For Marriage petition.

Sorority History

KAL's Beginnings
During her second year of attendance at Clark Atlanta University, the founder became interested in forming a Sisterhood for lesbians.  Inspired by various special-interest fraternal organizations, she set out to design an organization for LBT women.

On the evening of October 19, 2003, the founder drafted the basis of Kappa Alpha Lambda Sorority.  The purpose of the organization, as stated in the inaugural Constitution and Bylaws, would be to provide a place that nurtured the "personal and professional development of lesbian women of merit."

Early development of the Sorority included the adoption of its colors, mascot, and various other symbols.  It was also decided, in December 2003, that Kappa would focus on the creation of partnerships with civic organizations targeting LGBT and women's health issues.

Philanthropy: 2003-2011
Beginning with AIDSwalk Atlanta 2003, Sorority members committed to working with various organizations in an effort to improve the community.  In Kappa Alpha Lambda's first five years, local colonies and chapters have continued to contribute funds and community service hours to AIDSwalk each year.

In early 2004, members recognized the impact of untreated health conditions on the lesbian population, and chose the Susan G. Komen Foundation (now Susan G. Komen for the Cure) and the Atlanta Lesbian Cancer Initiative as Sorority partners.

On October 19, 2004, Kappa Alpha Lambda launched its first Signature Program, the Winter Wonderland Project.  Designed to provide gifts for children under the care of child-focused charities and advocacy groups, Winter Wonderland is the Sorority's longest running privately instituted philanthropy.

By the second quarter of 2005, ΚΆΛ members had approved the development of a Sorority Programming Platform.  Named the Five Facets, the initiative would become the foundation of Kappa Alpha Lambda's future civic endeavors.  All Sorority colonies and chapters use the Facets as a guideline for the development of community service programming.

The Sorority's interest in combating human rights violations on the international stage continued to grow, and The Polaris Project became a partner in April 2005.  By July of the same year, the Sorority's National President released a letter requesting the help of all LGBT sororities and fraternities in the effort to stop genocide in Darfur, Sudan.  To date, Kappa Alpha Lambda still offers philanthropic programs aimed at increasing awareness and providing financial support to the region.

In September 2005, Kappa Alpha Lambda became the only LGBT fraternal organization to sign the Human Rights Campaign's Million for Marriage Petition.

Expansion: The First Five Years

Though the Sorority was founded in Atlanta, its home chapter would not be officially chartered until May 21, 2004.

During the first two years of Kappa Alpha Lambda's existence, no effort was made to extend membership beyond the local area.  Sorority members agreed that emphasis should be placed on internal development before seeking to expand.  In June 2005, membership inquiries began arriving from New York, Florida, and other areas.  On October 31, 2005, Kappa Alpha Lambda held its first National initiation, and established New York City Professional Colony and chartered March 1, 2009.  The Los Angeles Professional Colony was established the following summer and was also charted March 1, 2009.

Membership Intake
Since its beginnings, the Sorority has held membership intake as a private, invitation-only process.  In order to be considered for an invitation, a candidate must identify as a lesbian, have reached the age of majority, and have a consistent record of service to the community.

Prospective members contact the nearest local colony or chapter and express their interest in receiving an invitation.  The local members then interact with the prospective member, learning her interests, personality, and commitment to the philanthropic programs of the Sorority.  Women located in an area where ΚΆΛ is not represented can submit a Request for Information through the Sorority's National website.

If the prospective member is deemed a good candidate for Membership, she is approved by the members and given an invitation.  After this, the membership education process begins.

Membership Classifications
At the time of initiation, new Members are classified as Collegiate or Professional.  Collegiate members are currently matriculating students at a two or four year college or university and maintain the required cumulative GPA for membership.  Professional members are women who have obtained a post-secondary degree or have comparable professional experience.

The distinction of honorary membership is conveyed to women who have provided extraordinary service to the LGBT community, and who have made a consistent effort to contribute positively to lesbian and mainstream life.

Organization

Geographic Structure
Kappa Alpha Lambda Sorority Incorporated is structured into six provinces, each of which serves a specific geographic area.  As each geographic area is occupied, a staff is appointed to act as liaison between local entities and the National organization.

References

External links
 Kappa Alpha Lambda Sorority

Lesbian organizations in the United States
LGBT fraternities and sororities
Student organizations established in 2003
2003 establishments in Georgia (U.S. state)
LGBT in Georgia (U.S. state)